AD 30 (XXX) was a common year starting on Sunday (link will display the full calendar) of the Julian calendar. At the time, it was known as the Year of the Consulship of Vinicius and Longinus (or, less frequently, year 783 Ab urbe condita). The denomination AD 30 for this year has been used since the early medieval period, when the Anno Domini calendar era became the prevalent method in Europe for naming years.

Events

By place

South Asia 
 The Kushan Empire is founded (approximate date).

Roman Empire 
 7 April (Good Friday) – Jesus is crucified (according to one dating scheme).   He is later reported alive by his disciples.
 Agrippina the Elder (the wife of Germanicus) and two of her sons, Nero Julius Caesar and Drusus Caesar, are arrested and exiled on orders of Lucius Aelius Sejanus (the prefect of the Praetorian Guard), and later starved to death in suspicious circumstances. In Sejanus's purge of Agrippina the Elder and her family, her son Caligula, and her three daughters, Agrippina the Younger, Julia Drusilla and Julia Livilla are the only survivors.
 Phaedrus translates Aesop's fables, and composes some of his own.
 Velleius Paterculus writes the general history of the countries known in Antiquity.

Births 
November 8 – Nerva, Roman emperor (d. AD 98)
 Jia Kui, Chinese Confucian philosopher (d. AD 101)
 Mobon of Goguryeo, Korean king (d. AD 53)
Poppaea Sabina, second wife of Nero (d. AD 65)
 Quintus Petillius Cerialis, Roman general

Deaths 

 April 7 – Jesus of Nazareth, (possible date of the crucifixion) (born circa 4 BC) The other possible dates also supported by scholarly consensus among a survey of 100 published scholarly biblical statements are April 6, AD 31 and April 3, AD 33.
 Shammai, Jewish Talmudic scholar (b. 50 BC)

References  

0030

als:30er#30